The following is a list of newspapers in Nagaland.

English language
Eastern Mirror (Dimapur, English)
Mokokchung Times, (Mokokchung, English)
The Morung Express (Dimapur, English)
Nagaland Page (Dimapur, English)
Nagaland Post (Dimapur, English)
Zünheboto Times (Zünheboto, English)

Vernacular
Capi (Kohima, Tenyidie)
Nagamese Khobor (Nagamese)
Sümi Zümulhü (Sümi)
Tir Yimyim (Dimapur, Ao)

Defunct

English
Citizens' Voice (English)
Hills Express (English)
The Kohima Weekly (Kohima, English)
Nagaland Express (Dimapur, English)
Nagaland News Review (English)
Nagaland Observer (English)
Nagaland Times (English)
Nagaland Today (English)
The Naga Nation (English)
Platform (English)
Ura Mail (Dimapur, English)

Vernacular
Ao Milen (Mokokchung, Ao)
Ketho mu Kevi (Kohima, Tenyidie)
Kewhira Dielie (Kohima, Tenyidie)
Ralha (Kohima, Tenyidie)

See also
List of newspapers

References

 
Lists of newspapers published in India